Marco Foscarini (February 4, 1696 in Venice – March 31, 1763 in Venice) was a Venetian poet, writer and statesman who served as the 117th Doge of Venice from May 31, 1762 until his death. He studied in his youth in Bologna, and was active as a diplomat, serving as ambassador to the Holy See and to Savoy; he also served as the Procurator of St Mark's for a time. He was succeeded as Doge by Alvise Giovanni Mocenigo.

Liceo classico Marco Foscarini, a school in Venice, was named after him to honour his History of Venetian literature.

1696 births
1763 deaths
Fellows of the Royal Society
18th-century Venetian people
18th-century Doges of Venice
Procurators of Saint Mark